The MP-461 (Mechanical Plant-461) is a Russian compact non-lethal pistol.

History 
The gun was designed in early 2000s. In January 2002 Izhevsk Mechanical Plant announced name and photo of new MP-461 pistol. In March 2002, the prototype was presented at the "IWA-2002" exhibition in Nuremberg and offered for export.

In November 2002, this pistol was shown at the "INTERPOLITEX-2002" exhibition in Moscow and plant started its serial production.

Since 2007 MP-461 are equipped with laser designator.

Design 
The MP-461 is a two-barreled break-action gun. It has two vertical chambers in its detachable chamber block.

Users 

  – it is used by private security guards
  – since June 27, 2002 is allowed as self-defense weapon for civil population
  – The use of non-lethal weapons in Russia is permitted to civil population, and it is also used by private security and law enforcement units.

References

Sources 
 Михаил Драгунов. Стражник. Второе пришествие // журнал «Калашников. Оружие. Боеприпасы. Снаряжение», № 12, 2005. стр.38-41
 "Стражник" в кармане // журнал "Мастер-ружьё", № 12 (129), декабрь 2007. стр.78-79
 Сергей Монетчиков. Арсенал: современное российское служебное и гражданское оружие самообороны // журнал «Братишка», июль 2008

External links
 M. R. Popenker. Оружие самообороны: пистолет травматический бесствольный Стражник МР-461 (Россия) / "Modern Firearms"

Pistols of Russia
Multiple-barrel firearms
Non-lethal firearms of Russia
Izhevsk Mechanical Plant products